Jone Wesele is a Fijian rugby league footballer, noted for playing for Fiji. He plays his domestic rugby with the Police Sharks in his native Fiji but then moved back to his original club that he started off, having previously played for the Darlington Point, Coleambally Roosters in Australia. He played in the 2008 Rugby League World Cup and most recently the 2009 Pacific Cup.
Now Jone Wesele has moved back and plays for the Makoi Bulldogs.

References

Living people
Fiji national rugby league team players
Fijian rugby league players
I-Taukei Fijian people
Year of birth missing (living people)